1978 Uganda Cup was the fourth season of the main Ugandan football Cup.

Overview
The competition has also been known as the Kakungulu Cup and was won by Nsambya Old Timers FC who beat Uganda Commercial Bank FC 1-0 in the final.  The results are not available for the earlier rounds

Final

Footnotes

External links
 Uganda - List of Cup Finals - RSSSF (Mikael Jönsson, Ian King and Hans Schöggl)

Ugandan Cup
Uganda Cup
Cup